Sir William Pole, 4th Baronet (1678 – 31 December 1741), of Colcombe Castle, near Colyton and Shute, near Honiton, Devon was an English landowner and Tory politician who sat in the English and British House of Commons between 1701 and 1734.

Pole was the eldest son of Sir John Pole, 3rd Baronet, MP and Anne Morice, the daughter of Sir William Morice, MP. He matriculated at New College, Oxford on 7 July 1696, aged 18. He succeeded his father in 1708.

Pole was returned unopposed as a Tory Member of Parliament (MP)  for Newport on the Morice interest at the second general election of 1701. He supported, on 26 Feb. 1702, the motion vindicating the Commons’ proceedings in impeaching the Whig ministers. He was returned as MP for Camelford at a by-election on 17 January 1704 and became a very active member, frequently acting as a teller for the Tories. He voted for the Tack in 1704. At the 1705 English general election, he retained his seat at Camelford and voted against the Court candidate for the Speaker on 25 October 1705. At the 1708 British general election he was returned unopposed again for Newport on the Morice interest. He was less active in the parliament and became a founder-member of the High Tory ‘Board of Brothers’. He voted against the impeachment of Dr Sacheverell. At the 1710 British general election he was returned as MP for Devon. He was appointed Master of the Household in 1712 but lost the resulting by-election on 22 July 1712. He was returned unopposed for Bossiney at the 1713 British general election. On the accession of George I in 1714 he lost his post in the Household.

Pole was elected MP for Honiton at a by-election on 17 March 1716 and was returned again in a contest  at the 1722 British general election when he was also returned for Newport. He was defeated at Honiton at the 1727 British general election but was seated on petition on 15 March 1731. He did not stand in 1734. He voted constitently against the administration.

Pole married Elizabeth Warry, the daughter of Robert Warry of Shute, Devon, 'many years' before he made his will in 1733 in which he recommended and requested that his son never stand for Parliament.  He died from ‘gout in his stomach’ on 31 December 1741.  He was succeeded by his son, John, and also had a daughter.

References

1678 births
1741 deaths
Members of the Parliament of Great Britain for Devon
Members of the Parliament of Great Britain for constituencies in Cornwall
Members of the pre-1707 English Parliament for constituencies in Cornwall
English MPs 1701–1702
English MPs 1702–1705
English MPs 1705–1707
British MPs 1707–1708
British MPs 1708–1710
British MPs 1710–1713
British MPs 1713–1715
British MPs 1715–1722
British MPs 1722–1727
British MPs 1727–1734
Masters of the Household
Baronets in the Baronetage of England
Tory MPs (pre-1834)
Members of the Parliament of Great Britain for Honiton